Fro or FRO may refer to:
 'fro, short for an Afro hairstyle
 Frø (Freyr), a Norse god

Institutions and organizations
 Family Responsibility Office, Government of Ontario, Canada
 Forest range officer, in India
 Frontline Ltd., an oil tanker shipping company
 Voluntary Radio Organisation, a Swedish volunteer defense organization

Places
 6666 Frö, a main-belt asteroid
 Faroe Islands
 Florø Airport, Norway
 Frome railway station, England

Other uses
 Fixed return option
 Old French

See also 
 Froe